Tom Moloughney (8 October 1888 – 27 July 1977) was an amateur athlete and an Australian rules footballer who played with Fitzroy and St Kilda in the Victorian Football League (VFL).

Family
The son of Thomas Moloughney (-1923), and Margaret Moloughney (-1914), née Quan, Thomas Moloughney was born at Melbourne on 8 October 1888.

He married Bessie Tyack in 1917.

Football

Fitzroy (VFL)
Recruited from Leopold, he made his debut, as one of the seven new players for Fitzroy — i.e., Ernie Everett, Jack Furness, Cliff Hutton, Frank Lamont, Tom Moloughney, Danny Murphy, and Eric Watson — against Melbourne on 29 April 1911.

St Kilda (VFL)
Recruited from South Melbourne C.Y.M.S., he played in one match for the St Kilda First XVIII, against Melbourne, at the Junction Oval, on 29 May 1915.

Notes

References

External links 
 		
 

1888 births
1977 deaths
Australian rules footballers from Melbourne
Fitzroy Football Club players
St Kilda Football Club players
Leopold Football Club (MJFA) players